Coroado Purí is an extinct language of eastern Brazil.

References

Purian languages
Extinct languages of South America
Languages extinct in the 19th century
Indigenous languages of Eastern Brazil